Flavius Scorpus also known as Scorpius (c. 68–95 AD) was a famous charioteer in Roman times who lived at the end of the 1st century AD. Scorpus rode for the Green faction during his lifetime and accumulated 2,048 victories. As one of the most famous drivers in Roman history, he earned extraordinarily large amounts of money; his income surpassing that of professional Roman sponsors. Scorpus died young, at 27 years of age.

Scorpus was a slave, as were many charioteers, and was born at Hispania, the nowadays Iberian Peninsula. He received the laurel wreath many times, which is a symbol of continuous victory. Often at the end of a victorious game, fans threw him money. Eventually, he bought his freedom, becoming a libertus (freed slave).

Martial, a Roman poet, refers to Scorpus twice in Book X of his Epigrams, composed between 95 and 98 AD:

and

Although the cause of Scorpus' death is unknown, it is likely to have been in one of the numerous crashes that occurred during chariot races, known as naufragia ("shipwrecks"). Charioteers wrapped the reins around their bodies in order to use their body weight to better control the horses. While this was extremely dangerous, the drivers carried knives that, in the case of an accident, would be used to cut themselves free. However, often after a crash the charioteers were unable to release themselves in time. Crashes often occurred near the turning posts, as shown in a circus relief in the Pergamon Museum in Berlin, which shows a fallen charioteer being trampled by another team.

References

External links
James Grout: Scorpus part of the Encyclopædia Romana
http://www.vroma.org/~bmcmanus/circus.html
https://earlychurchhistory.org/entertainment/scorpus-the-charioteer/

Ancient Roman sportspeople
Ancient chariot racing
68 births
95 deaths